Dick Norman and Kristof Vliegen chose to not defend their title.
Jan Hájek and Dušan Karol won in the final 4–6, 6–4, [10–5], against Martin Kližan and Adil Shamasdin.

Seeds

Draw

Draw

References
 Doubles Draw

Black Forest Open - Doubles
Black Forest Open